Kateb University is a private university established in 2007, located in the city of Kabul, Afghanistan.

Faculties
The Kateb University having the following faculties:
 Faculty of Law
 Faculty of Engineering
 Faculty of Political Science
 Faculty of Economics
 Faculty of Medicine
 Faculty of Education Management
 Faculty of Sociology
 Faculty of Computer Science

Notable alumni
Samira Asghari
Khushnood Nabizada
Malek Shafi'i

References

External links
 Kateb University

Educational institutions established in 2007
Universities and colleges in Kabul
Universities in Afghanistan
Private universities in Afghanistan
2007 establishments in Afghanistan